Hassan Raed Hassan Matrook (born 23 September 2000) is an Iraqi footballer who plays as a defender for Al-Quwa Al-Jawiya in the Iraqi Premier League.

International career
On 12 November 2020, Raed made his first international cap with Iraq against Jordan in a friendly.

Honours
Al-Quwa Al-Jawiya
 Iraqi Premier League: 2020–21
 Iraq FA Cup: 2020–21

References

2000 births
Living people
Iraqi footballers
Iraq international footballers
Al-Quwa Al-Jawiya players
Association football defenders